Dale Saunders (born 9 November 1973 on Trinidad) is a former football player and now football coach from Trinidad and Tobago. He earned 48 caps and scored 4 goals for the national team between 1997 and 2003. He played as a midfielder. Since 2016 he's the coach of Central F.C. until he left in September 2017.

Clubs
 Mucurapo Senior Comprehensive
 Starworld Strikers
 San Juan Jabloteh
 Joe Public F.C.

External links
Bio at socawarriors.net

References 

1973 births
Living people
Trinidad and Tobago footballers
Trinidad and Tobago international footballers
Association football midfielders
South Starworld Strikers F.C. players
San Juan Jabloteh F.C. players
Joe Public F.C. players
TT Pro League players
1998 CONCACAF Gold Cup players
2002 CONCACAF Gold Cup players